Julius Sang (19 September 1948 – 9 April 2004) was a Kenyan athlete. Along with teammates Robert Ouko, Charles Asati and Munyoro Nyamau he won the 4 x 400 relay race at the 1972 Summer Olympics for Kenya. He also took a bronze medal in the individual 400 meter race.

He ran for North Carolina Central University, where he was part of their record-setting team at the Penn Relays. Sang was married to fellow runner Tecla Chemabwai Sang.

External links
 

1948 births
2004 deaths
Kenyan male long jumpers
Kenyan male sprinters
North Carolina Central University alumni
College men's track and field athletes in the United States
Athletes (track and field) at the 1968 Summer Olympics
Athletes (track and field) at the 1972 Summer Olympics
Olympic athletes of Kenya
Olympic gold medalists for Kenya
Olympic bronze medalists for Kenya
Athletes (track and field) at the 1966 British Empire and Commonwealth Games
Athletes (track and field) at the 1970 British Commonwealth Games
Athletes (track and field) at the 1974 British Commonwealth Games
Commonwealth Games gold medallists for Kenya
Commonwealth Games medallists in athletics
Medalists at the 1972 Summer Olympics
Olympic gold medalists in athletics (track and field)
Olympic bronze medalists in athletics (track and field)
Medallists at the 1970 British Commonwealth Games
Medallists at the 1974 British Commonwealth Games